Ibrahim Githaiga (born 23 March 1969) is a Kenyan rower. He competed in the men's single sculls event at the 2004 Summer Olympics.

References

1969 births
Living people
Kenyan male rowers
Olympic rowers of Kenya
Rowers at the 2004 Summer Olympics
People from Uasin Gishu County
21st-century Kenyan people